The Tank Man may refer to:
Tank Man, also known as the Unknown Rebel, the Chinese who stood in the path of a column of tanks following the Tiananmen Square protests of 1989
The Tank Man, a documentary film about the above protests and part of the Frontline series